Mutel Peak is a rock peak (860 m) 2 nautical miles (3.7 km) southwest of Mount Iphigene in the Ford Ranges, Marie Byrd Land. Photographed and roughly plotted by the Byrd Antarctic Expedition, 1928–30, and United States Antarctic Service (USAS), 1939–41. Mapped by United States Geological Survey (USGS) from surveys and U.S. Navy air photos, 1959–65. Named by Advisory Committee on Antarctic Names (US-ACAN) for Robert L. Mutel, ionospheric physicist at Byrd Station, 1969.

Mountains of Marie Byrd Land